{{DISPLAYTITLE:C30H52O4}} 
The molecular formula C30H52O4 (molar mass: 476.73 g/mol, exact mass: 476.3866 u) may refer to:

 Panaxatriol
 Protopanaxatriol (PPT)

Molecular formulas